The 1864 National Union National Convention was the United States presidential nominating convention of the National Union Party, which was a name adopted by the main faction of the Republican Party in a coalition with many, if not most, War Democrats after some Republicans and War Democrats nominated John C. Frémont over Lincoln.   During the Convention, the party officially called for the end of the ongoing Civil War, the eradication of slavery and the adoption of the Emancipation Proclamation.

Background

The party name was created in May 1864, during the Civil War, ahead of the 1864 presidential election, in which President Abraham Lincoln, then a Republican, was running for reelection.

The Radical Republicans, a hard-line faction within Lincoln's own party, held the belief that Lincoln was incompetent and therefore could not be re-elected and had already formed a party called the Radical Democracy Party, for which a few hundred delegates had convened in Cleveland, Ohio, on May 31, 1864. They eventually nominated John C. Frémont, who had been the Republicans' first presidential nominee during the 1856 election. It was hoped that this act would cause someone other than Lincoln to gain the Republican nomination.

Republicans loyal to Lincoln created a new name for their party at the convention in Baltimore, Maryland, during the first week in June 1864, in order to accommodate the War Democrats who supported the war and wished to separate themselves from the Copperheads. The convention dropped then-Vice President Hannibal Hamlin, a Radical Republican from the ticket, and chose War Democrat Andrew Johnson as Lincoln's running mate. The National Unionists hoped that the new party and the Lincoln–Johnson ticket would stress the national character of the war.

Party platform
The party supported a Platform of 11 resolutions.  Several resolutions were notable as they specified that the cause of the Civil War was slavery, called for slavery's eradication from the union, called for the complete destruction of the Confederacy, opened military enlistment to freed slaves, adopted the Emancipation Proclamation, and supported an increase in foreign immigration and asylum as just policy. Dennis Francis Murphy, member of the Official Corps of Reporters for the U.S. Senate, transcribed the unveiling of, and response to, the resolutions:

Presidential nomination

Presidential candidates 

On the first ballot, Missouri delegates cast their 22 votes for General Ulysses S. Grant. The Missourians quickly changed their votes to make Lincoln's renomination unanimous.

Presidential Balloting / 2nd Day of Convention (June 8, 1864)

Vice Presidential nomination

Vice Presidential candidates 

Though Hamlin hoped to be re-nominated as vice president, the convention instead nominated Andrew Johnson, the military governor of Tennessee. Lincoln had refused to weigh in on his preferred running mate, and the convention chose to nominate Johnson, a Southern War Democrat, in order to boost the party's appeal to Unionists of both parties.

Vice Presidential Balloting / 2nd Day of Convention (June 8, 1864)

Lincoln's acceptance
In keeping with the tradition of the time, Lincoln did not attend the convention. On hearing the news of his re-nomination, he wrote on June 9, 1864:

See also
 1864 Democratic National Convention
 1866 National Union Convention
 History of the United States Republican Party
 List of Republican National Conventions
 1864 United States presidential election

References

External links

 Republican Party Platform of 1864 at The American Presidency Project
 Lincoln nomination acceptance letter at The American Presidency Project

1864 United States presidential election
1864 conferences
Presidency of Abraham Lincoln
Abraham Lincoln
Andrew Johnson
Ulysses S. Grant